The Niki 2004 is a family of Bulgarian autogyros, designed and produced by Niki Rotor Aviation of Pravets. The aircraft is supplied as a kit for amateur construction or as a complete ready-to-fly-aircraft.

Design and development
The Niki 2004 features a single main rotor, a two-seats-in side-by-side configuration enclosed cockpit, tricycle landing gear and a  four-cylinder, air-cooled, four-stroke, single-ignition  Subaru EJ22 auto-conversion engine in pusher configuration.

The aircraft fuselage is made from monocoque aluminum sheet, with a steel rotor mast and the twin tails supported by aluminium tubing.

Variants
2004
2004M
2008

Specifications (2004M)

References

External links

2004
2000s Bulgarian sport aircraft
Homebuilt aircraft
Single-engined pusher autogyros
Vehicles introduced in 2004